Urnisa guttulosa is a species of short-horned grasshopper in the family Acrididae. It is found in Australia.

Subspecies
These subspecies belong to the species Urnisa guttulosa:
 Urnisa guttulosa guttulosa (Walker, 1870) (Common Urnisa)
 Urnisa guttulosa minor Sjöstedt, 1921

References

External links

 

Catantopinae
Insects of Australia